Dacus (Metidacus) is a subgenus of fruit flies in the family Tephritidae.

References

Dacinae
Insect subgenera